Abdul Wahid Nazari is an Afghan film writer, director and producer. He is the director of Radio Television Afghanistan.

Early life
Abdul Wahid was born to Mohammad Amin Nazari in 1954 in Kandahar, Afghanistan. He completed his high school from Rahman Baba High School in Kabul.

Abdul Wahid was admitted in the Faculty of Law and Political science at Kabul University. A year later he received a scholarship to Bulgaria where he studied Cinema and Television. In 1982 he received a PhD and returned to Afghanistan.

Soon after returning to Afghanistan in 1982, he started working as a TV director and than a movie director. In the meantime, he was appointed as the director of Afghan films and a professor at the Faculty of Arts in Kabul University.

In 2005 he was appointed as the head of Ariana Television and later the head of Shamshad Television.

Works

Films or movies
 Staso pa Hewad kay magar khar nasta
 Dray Shpay De Yaw Zarawar Yaway Shpay Sakha
 parwareshgah Watan (1983)
 Lahza Ha (1984)
 Armaan (1988)
 Ka Ghoshchey (1988)
 De Lmar Pa Lor (1992)
 Afghanistan Bay La Shor Wayano Sakha, Documentary (1990)
 De Konday Zoy (1991)
 Gumrah (2002)
 Hijrat (2004)

Comic publications
 Agar Nadidey Bawar Kun (1997)
 Gula Rasa Ka Yay Goray (1997)
 Wah Wah Guli Sib (1997)
 Kala War De Aba Aw Kala (2002)
 Deega Chotor Hastey (2002)
 Akhir Ba Yay Sanga See? (2003)
 yak ba dunia sad Ba akherat (2003)
 History of Afghan cinema (2011)
 Chel wazir be aqal  (2013)

References

Afghan film directors
Pashtun people
Living people
1953 births